Bay Central is a complex of three towers in Dubai Marina in Dubai, United Arab Emirates.  The West Tower, and the Intercontinental Tower stand at a height of 42 floors.  The Central Tower, consists of 50 floors (180 metres).  The Central and West towers are residential towers and were completed in 2013. The third tower is the Intercontinental Hotel and was opened in May 2015 after a 2-year delay.

See also
 List of tallest buildings in Dubai

References

External links
Bay Central Emporis
CTBUH

Skyscraper hotels in Dubai
Residential skyscrapers in Dubai